The 1990 All-Ireland Minor Football Championship was the 59th staging of the All-Ireland Minor Football Championship, the Gaelic Athletic Association's premier inter-county Gaelic football tournament for boys under the age of 18.

Derry entered the championship as defending champions, however, they were defeated by Meath in the All-Ireland semi-final.

On 16 September 1990, Meath won the championship following a 2-11 to 2-9 defeat of Kerry in the All-Ireland final. This was their second All-Ireland title and their first title in 33 championship seasons.

Results

Connacht Minor Football Championship

Quarter-Final

Semi-Finals

Final

Munster Minor Football Championship

Quarter-Finals

Semi-Finals

Final

Ulster Minor Football Championship

Preliminary Round

Quarter-Finals

Semi-Finals

Final

Leinster Minor Football Championship

Preliminary Round

Quarter-Finals

Semi-Finals

Final

All-Ireland Minor Football Championship

Semi-Finals

Final

Championship statistics

Miscellaneous

 Hugh Carolan of Meath achieves a unique double by adding an All-Ireland medal to the Leinster Schools Rugby Senior Cup medal he earlier won with Blackrock College.

References

1990
All-Ireland Minor Football Championship